The Dr. Edward H. Williams House at 506 South Atlantic Avenue in Beach Haven, Ocean County, New Jersey is a Queen Anne-style summer house built . It was designed by Wilson Brothers & Company for Edward H. Williams, a partner in the Baldwin Locomotive Works, and is a mirror image of the Converse Cottage next door. It was added to the National Register of Historic Places on July 14, 1983, for its significance in architecture. It was listed as part of the Beach Haven Multiple Resource Area (MRA). It is also a contributing property of the Beach Haven Historic District.

See also
 National Register of Historic Places listings in Ocean County, New Jersey

References

Beach Haven, New Jersey
National Register of Historic Places in Ocean County, New Jersey
Houses on the National Register of Historic Places in New Jersey
Historic district contributing properties in New Jersey
Houses completed in 1884
Houses in Ocean County, New Jersey
New Jersey Register of Historic Places
Queen Anne architecture in New Jersey